The 1904 Idaho gubernatorial election was held on November 8, 1904. Republican nominee Frank R. Gooding defeated Democratic nominee Henry Heitfeld with 58.74% of the vote.

General election

Candidates
Major party candidates
Frank R. Gooding, Republican 
Henry Heitfeld, Democratic

Other candidates
Theodore B. Shaw, Socialist
Edwin R. Headley, Prohibition
T. W. Bartley, People's

Results

References

1904
Idaho
Gubernatorial